Dominik Kraut (born 15 January 1990) is a Czech football player who currently plays for FC Hlučín.

References

External links

1990 births
Living people
Czech footballers
Czech Republic youth international footballers
Czech First League players
FC Baník Ostrava players
FK Ústí nad Labem players
Association football midfielders
1. FK Příbram players
FC Fastav Zlín players
FC Hlučín players
MFK Vítkovice players